Sanford's bowerbird (Archboldia sanfordi) is a subspecies of the Archbold's bowerbird. The Sanford's bowerbird is a black bowerbird with a reddish-brown iris, grey feet and black bill. The male has a golden crest extending from forehead, blackish wing and long tail. Both sexes are alike. The female is smaller with blue-grey feet and without crown feathering.

A polygamous species, the Sanford's bowerbird inhabits to eastern highlands of Papua New Guinea. The diet consists mainly of fruits. This bowerbird was discovered by Ernest Thomas Gilliard in 1950 at Mount Hagen, Papua New Guinea.  It is named after Leonard Cutler Sanford, a trustee of the American Museum of Natural History.

References 

Sanford's bowerbird
Birds of Papua New Guinea
Sanford's bowerbird